The 1999 Nokia Cup was an indoor women's tennis tournament played on indoor carpet courts in Prostějov, Czech Republic. The tournament was one of the WTA Tier IV tournaments in the 1999 WTA Tour. It was the inaugural and only edition of the tournament and was held from 8 February until 14 February 1999. Fourth-seeded Henrieta Nagyová won the singles title.

Finals

Singles

 Henrieta Nagyová defeated  Silvia Farina, 7–6(7–2), 6–4
 It was Nagyová's only title of the year and the 7th of her career.

Doubles

 Alexandra Fusai /  Nathalie Tauziat defeated  Květa Hrdličková /  Helena Vildová, 3–6, 6–2, 6–1

Entrants

Seeds

Other entrants
The following players received wildcards into the singles main draw:
  Michaela Paštiková
  Lenka Němečková

The following players received wildcards into the doubles main draw:
  Henrieta Nagyová /  Lenka Němečková

The following players received entry from the qualifying draw:

  Denisa Chládková
  Julia Abe
  Amanda Hopmans
  Anca Barna

The following player received entry as a lucky loser:
  Katarína Studeníková

References

External links
ITF tournament details

Nokia Cup
Nokia Cup
1999 in Czech tennis